Washakie County is a county in the U.S. state of Wyoming. As of the 2020 United States Census, the population was 7,685. Its county seat is Worland.

History
Washakie County was created on February 21, 1911, as Hanover County with land detached from Big Horn County and organized in 1913. The bill for creating the county initially named it "Hanover County", but it was renamed before the bill passed to Washakie County for the head chief of the Shoshone people, Chief Washakie, who became an ally of the US Government.

Geography

Adjacent counties

Big Horn County – north
Johnson County – east
Natrona County – southeast
Fremont County – south
Hot Springs County – west
Park County – northwest

National protected area
Bighorn National Forest (part)

Demographics

2000 census
As of the 2000 United States Census, there were 8,289 people, 3,278 households, and 2,310 families in the county. The population density was 4 people per square mile (1/km2). There were 3,654 housing units at an average density of 2 per square mile (1/km2). The racial makeup of the county was 90.22% White, 0.11% Black or African American, 0.55% Native American, 0.74% Asian, 6.21% from other races, and 2.17% from two or more races. 11.47% of the population were Hispanic or Latino of any race. 27.1% were of German, 13.1% English, 9.9% Irish and 6.2% American ancestry.

There were 3,278 households, out of which 32.40% had children under the age of 18 living with them, 59.90% were married couples living together, 7.30% had a female householder with no husband present, and 29.50% were non-families. 26.50% of all households were made up of individuals, and 11.90% had someone living alone who was 65 years of age or older. The average household size was 2.47 and the average family size was 3.00.

The county population contained 27.20% under the age of 18, 6.40% from 18 to 24, 25.20% from 25 to 44, 25.30% from 45 to 64, and 15.90% who were 65 years of age or older. The median age was 39 years. For every 100 females there were 99.40 males. For every 100 females age 18 and over, there were 96.30 males.

The median income for a household in the county was $34,943, and the median income for a family was $42,584. Males had a median income of $31,633 versus $21,028 for females. The per capita income for the county was $17,780. About 10.00% of families and 14.10% of the population were below the poverty line, including 21.10% of those under age 18 and 12.20% of those age 65 or over.

2010 census
As of the 2010 United States Census, there were 8,533 people, 3,492 households, and 2,395 families in the county. The racial makeup of the county was 91.4% white, 1.1% American Indian, 0.6% Asian, 0.3% black or African American, 4.4% from other races, and 2.4% from two or more races. Those of Hispanic or Latino origin made up 13.6% of the population. In terms of ancestry, 33.1% were German, 17.6% were English, 11.7% were Irish, 6.6% were American, and 5.5% were Norwegian.

Of the 3,492 households, 30.0% had children under the age of 18 living with them, 56.4% were married couples living together, 7.9% had a female householder with no husband present, 31.4% were non-families, and 27.7% of all households were made up of individuals. The average household size was 2.40 and the average family size was 2.93. The median age was 41.8 years.

The median income for a household in the county was $48,379 and the median income for a family was $61,340. Males had a median income of $45,579 versus $30,107 for females. The per capita income for the county was $28,557. About 1.7% of families and 5.6% of the population were below the poverty line, including 1.8% of those under age 18 and 9.9% of those age 65 or over.

Communities

City
 Worland (county seat)

Town
 Ten Sleep

Unincorporated communities

 Airport Road
 Big Trails
 Mc Nutt
 South Flat
 Washakie Ten
 West River
 Winchester

Government and infrastructure
Like almost all of Wyoming, Washakie County is overwhelmingly Republican. No Democratic presidential candidate has carried Washakie County since Franklin D. Roosevelt’s 1936 landslide against Alf Landon. Although Lyndon Johnson did get within eighteen votes of Barry Goldwater, no Democrat since has reached one-third of the county’s vote.

The Wyoming Department of Family Services Juvenile Services Division operates the Wyoming Boys' School, located in Mc Nutt, unincorporated Washakie County, near Worland. The facility was operated by the Wyoming Board of Charities and Reform until that agency was dissolved as a result of a state constitutional amendment passed in November 1990.

See also

National Register of Historic Places listings in Washakie County, Wyoming
Wyoming
List of cities and towns in Wyoming
List of counties in Wyoming
Wyoming statistical areas

References

 
1913 establishments in Wyoming
Populated places established in 1913